In enzymology, a NADPH—hemoprotein reductase is an enzyme that catalyzes the chemical reaction

NADPH + H+ + n oxidized hemoprotein  NADP+ + n reduced hemoprotein

The 3 substrates of this enzyme are NADPH, H+, and oxidized hemoprotein, whereas its two products are NADP+ and reduced hemoprotein.

This enzyme belongs to the family of oxidoreductases, specifically those acting on NADH or NADPH with a heme protein as acceptor.  The systematic name of this enzyme class is NADPH:hemoprotein oxidoreductase. Other names in common use include CPR, FAD-cytochrome c reductase, NADP---cytochrome c reductase, NADP---cytochrome reductase, NADPH-dependent cytochrome c reductase, NADPH:P-450 reductase, NADPH:ferrihemoprotein oxidoreductase, NADPH---cytochrome P-450 oxidoreductase, NADPH---cytochrome c oxidoreductase, NADPH---cytochrome c reductase, NADPH---cytochrome p-450 reductase, NADPH---ferricytochrome c oxidoreductase, NADPH---ferrihemoprotein reductase, TPNH2 cytochrome c reductase, TPNH-cytochrome c reductase, aldehyde reductase (NADPH-dependent), cytochrome P-450 reductase, cytochrome c reductase (reduced nicotinamide adenine dinucleotide, phosphate, NADPH, NADPH-dependent), dihydroxynicotinamide adenine dinucleotide phosphate-cytochrome c, reductase, ferrihemoprotein P-450 reductase, reduced nicotinamide adenine dinucleotide phosphate-cytochrome c, reductase, reductase, cytochrome c (reduced nicotinamide adenine dinucleotide, and phosphate).  It has 2 cofactors: FAD,  and FMN.

Structural studies

References

 
 
 
 
 
 
 
 
 
 
 
 

EC 1.6.2
NADPH-dependent enzymes
Flavoproteins
Enzymes of known structure